Wörpen is a former municipality in the district of Wittenberg, Saxony-Anhalt, Germany. Since January 2008, it is part of the town Coswig.

Former municipalities in Saxony-Anhalt
Coswig, Saxony-Anhalt